Colemansville is an unincorporated community in Harrison County, Kentucky, in the United States.

History
Colemansville was located on the railroad line out of Berry. A post office called Colemansville was established in 1834, and remained in operation until it was discontinued in 1878.

References

Unincorporated communities in Harrison County, Kentucky
Unincorporated communities in Kentucky